is a railway station in the city of Kani, Gifu Prefecture, Japan.

Lines

Station layout
Nishi Kani Station has two ground-level side platforms connected by a footbridge. The station is staffed.

Platforms

Adjacent stations

|-
!colspan=5|Meitetsu

History

Surrounding area
 Aigi Tunnel
 Meijo University, Kani campus

See also
 List of Railway Stations in Japan

References

External links
 
  
 Tohtetsu Bus bus service from Nishi Kani

Railway stations in Japan opened in 1928
Stations of Nagoya Railroad
Railway stations in Gifu Prefecture
Kani, Gifu